Mount Carter is located in the Livingston Range, Glacier National Park in the U.S. state of Montana. Rainbow Glacier is just south of Mount Carter while Weasel Collar Glacier is immediately northeast. Mount Carter is the tenth tallest peak in Glacier National Park.

See also 
 List of mountains and mountain ranges of Glacier National Park (U.S.)

References 

Livingston Range
Mountains of Flathead County, Montana
Mountains of Glacier National Park (U.S.)
Mountains of Montana